Serge Muller (born 1976) is a French politician who was elected as a member of the National Assembly for Dordogne's 2nd constituency in 2022.

Muller was born in Toulon in 1976. Before politics he was a caregiver in a mental hospital and then a psychiatric nurse. He is an RN candidate in the 2021 departmental elections in Saint-Astier before being a candidate in the June 2022 legislative elections and winning the election in the second round defeating Michel Delpon from La République En Marche!.

References

Living people
1976 births
People from Toulon
Deputies of the 16th National Assembly of the French Fifth Republic
21st-century French politicians
National Rally (France) politicians